The projector augmented wave method (PAW) is a technique used in ab initio electronic structure calculations. It is a generalization of the pseudopotential and linear augmented-plane-wave methods, and allows for density functional theory calculations to be performed with greater computational efficiency.

Valence wavefunctions tend to have rapid oscillations near ion cores due to the requirement that they be orthogonal to core states; this situation is problematic because it requires many Fourier components (or in the case of grid-based methods, a very fine mesh) to describe the wavefunctions accurately. The PAW approach addresses this issue by transforming these rapidly oscillating wavefunctions into smooth wavefunctions which are more computationally convenient, and provides a way to calculate all-electron properties from these smooth wavefunctions. This approach is somewhat reminiscent of a change from the Schrödinger picture to the Heisenberg picture.

Transforming the wavefunction 

The linear transformation  transforms the fictitious pseudo wavefunction  to the all-electron wavefunction :

Note that the "all-electron" wavefunction is a Kohn–Sham single particle wavefunction, and should not be confused with the many-body wavefunction. In order to have  and  differ only in the regions near the ion cores, we write

,

where  is non-zero only within some spherical augmentation region  enclosing atom .

Around each atom, it is useful to expand the pseudo wavefunction into pseudo partial waves:

 within .

Because the operator  is linear, the coefficients  can be written as an inner product with a set of so-called projector functions, :

where . The all-electron partial waves, are typically chosen to be solutions to the Kohn–Sham Schrödinger equation for an isolated atom. The transformation  is thus specified by three quantities:

 a set of all-electron partial waves 
 a set of pseudo partial waves 
 a set of projector functions 

and we can explicitly write it down as

Outside the augmentation regions, the pseudo partial waves are equal to the all-electron partial waves. Inside the spheres, they can be any smooth continuation, such as a linear combination of polynomials or Bessel functions.

The PAW method is typically combined with the frozen core approximation, in which the core states are assumed to be unaffected by the ion's environment. There are several online repositories of pre-computed atomic PAW data.

Transforming operators 

The PAW transformation allows all-electron observables to be calculated using the pseudo-wavefunction from a pseudopotential calculation, conveniently avoiding having to ever represent the all-electron wavefunction explicitly in memory. This is particularly important for the calculation of properties such as NMR, which strongly depend on the form of the wavefunction near the nucleus. Starting with the definition of the expectation value of an operator:

,

where you can substitute in the pseudo wavefunction as you know :

,

from which you can define the pseudo operator, indicated by a tilde:

.

.

ｗhere the indices  run over all projectors on all atoms. Usually only indices on the same atom are summed over, i.e. off-site contributions are ignored, and this is called the "on-site approximation".

In the original paper, Blöchl notes that there is a degree of freedom in this equation for an arbitrary operator , that is localised inside the spherical augmentation region, to add a term of the form:

,

which can be seen as the basis for implementation of pseudopotentials within PAW, as the nuclear coulomb potential can now be substituted with a smoother one.

Further reading

Software implementing the projector augmented-wave method 

 ABINIT
 CASTEP (to calculate NMR properties)
 CP-PAW
 GPAW
 ONETEP
 PWPAW
 S/PHI/nX
 Quantum ESPRESSO
 VASP

References 

Electronic structure methods
Computational chemistry
Computational physics
Condensed matter physics